Election results for the position of mayor, in Winnipeg, Manitoba, Canada.

1952 mayoral election
This election was held via instant-runoff voting.

First count:

Swailes was eliminated, and his 21,578 votes were distributed as follows: Coulter 7,138, Juba 5,718.  8,722 votes were non-transferable.

Second count:

1966 mayoral election
Last election before Unicity.

1971 mayoral election

1974 mayoral election

1977 mayoral election

1979 mayoral election
BY-ELECTION

1980 mayoral election

1983 mayoral election

1986 mayoral election

1989 mayoral election

1992 mayoral election

1995 mayoral election

1998 mayoral election

2002 mayoral election

2004 mayoral election
On June 22, 2004, a by-election was held to fill the position of mayor, vacant since Glen Murray's resignation on May 11, 2004.  At the same time, by-elections were held for councillor in the River Heights-Fort Garry and St. Boniface wards, and for two school trustees.

2006 mayoral election

2010 mayoral election

2014 mayoral election

2018 mayoral election

2022 mayoral election

See also
 List of municipal elections in Manitoba